En Directo may refer to:
 En Directo (EP), a 1989 EP by Héroes Del Silencio
 En Directo (Patricio Rey y sus Redonditos de Ricota album), 1992